Michel Reuter (24 November 1929 – 6 October 2008) was a Luxembourgian footballer. He competed in the men's tournament at the 1952 Summer Olympics.

References

External links
 
 

1929 births
2008 deaths
Luxembourgian footballers
Luxembourg international footballers
Olympic footballers of Luxembourg
Footballers at the 1952 Summer Olympics
People from Kayl
Association football defenders